was a Japanese politician. He held different cabinet posts and served as defense minister from 1988 to 1989.

Early life
Tazawa was born in 1918. He was a native of Inakadate, Aomori Prefecture.

Career
Tazawa was a member of the Liberal Democratic Party. He was first elected to the House of Representatives in 1960 and served there until 1996 when he lost his seat in the election. From 24 December 1976 to 28 November 1977 he was the director of national land agency.

He was appointed minister of agriculture, forestry and fisheries on 30 November 1981 in a cabinet reshuffle and succeeded Takeo Kameoka in the post. The cabinet was headed by Prime Minister Zenko Suzuki. Tazawa was in office until 26 November 1982. He was appointed minister of state and director-general of the Japan Defense Agency (today defense minister) on 24 August 1988 to the cabinet led by Prime Minister Noboru Takeshita. He replaced Tsutomu Kawara in the post who had resigned from office. Tazawa retained his post in the late December 1988 reshuffle. He was in office until 3 June 1989 when Taku Yamasaki was appointed to the post. Tazawa retired from politics and was appointed president of Hirosaki Gakuin University. He served in the post until his death in 2001.

Personal life and death
Tazawa's wife managed a large farm in Aomori which is one of the significant agricultural and fishing regions in Japan. Tazawa died of esophagus cancer at a hospital in Hirosaki, Aomori Prefecture, on 12 December 2001.

References

External links

|-

|-

|-

1918 births
2001 deaths
Deaths from cancer in Japan
Japanese defense ministers
Liberal Democratic Party (Japan) politicians
Members of the House of Representatives (Japan)
Ministers of Agriculture, Forestry and Fisheries of Japan
Politicians from Aomori Prefecture
Presidents of universities and colleges in Japan